The Windows logo key (also known as Windows, win, start, logo, flag, OS, or super key) is a keyboard key which was originally introduced on the Microsoft Natural keyboard in 1994. This key became a standard key on PC keyboards. In Windows tapping the key brings up the start menu.  performs the same function, in case the keyboard lacks this key.

History and usage
Historically, the addition of two Windows keys and a menu key marked the change from the 101/102-key to 104/105-key layout for PC keyboards. Compared to the former layout, a Windows key was placed between the left  and the left  and another Windows key and the menu key were placed between the right  (or ) and the right  key.

In laptop and other compact keyboards it is common to have just one Windows key (usually on the left). On Microsoft's Entertainment Desktop sets (designed for Windows Vista), the Windows key is in the middle of the keyboard, below all other keys (where the user's thumbs rest).

Some keyboards during the Windows Vista and 7 era feature a circular bump surrounding the logo which distinguishes its feeling from the other buttons.

On Windows 8 tablet computers, hardware certification requirements initially mandated that the Windows key be centered on the bezel below the screen, except on a convertible laptop, where the button is allowed to be off-center in a tablet configuration. This requirement was relaxed in Windows 8.1, allowing the Windows key to be placed on any bezel or edge of the unit, though a centered location along the bottom bezel is still preferred.

Licensing 
Microsoft regulates the appearance of the Windows key logo picture with a specially crafted license for keyboard manufacturers ("Microsoft Windows Logo Key Logo License Agreement for Keyboard Manufacturers"). With the introduction of a new Microsoft Windows logo, first used with Windows XP, the agreement was updated to require that the new design be adopted for all keyboards manufactured after 1 September 2003. However, with the release of Windows Vista, Microsoft published guidelines for a new Windows Logo key that incorporates the Windows logo recessed in a chamfered lowered circle with a contrast ratio of at least 3:1 with respect to background that the key is applied to.

In Common Building Block Keyboard Specification, all CBB compliant keyboards were to comply with the Windows Vista Hardware Start Button specification beginning on 1 June 2007.

Wikipedia uses the Unicode character  as a simulation of the logo.

Use with Microsoft Windows 
From the Windows 95 to Windows 7 releases of the operating system, tapping the Windows key by itself traditionally revealed Windows Taskbar (if not visible) and opened the Start menu. In Windows Server 2012 and Windows 8, this key launches the Start screen but doesn't show the taskbar. However, this feature was added back into Windows 10.

Pressing the key in combination with other keys allows invoking many common functions through the keyboard. Holding down  will not substitute for the Windows key in these combinations. Which Windows key combinations ("shortcuts") are available and active in a given Windows session depends on many factors, such as accessibility options, the type of the session (regular or Terminal Services), the Windows version, the presence of specific software such as IntelliType and Group Policy if applicable.

Below is a list of notable shortcuts which work natively. Unless otherwise noted, they are valid in the next version of Windows. Using aftermarket scripts, users can also make custom shortcuts.

Windows 95 and Windows NT 4.0
The following shortcuts are valid in Windows 95 and Windows NT 4.0.
  opens the Start Menu
  shows the desktop (hiding even non-minimizable windows), or restores hidden windows when pressed a second time.
  opens Windows Explorer with folder pane on left side of window.
  opens Find files and folders.
  minimizes all windows.
  opens the "Run Program Or File" Window.
  runs Utility Manager.
  or  opens properties of My Computer.
  opens Windows Help.
  opens Find computers.
  cycles through taskbar buttons. This key combination is reassigned in Windows Vista.

Windows 2000
Windows 2000 adds the following:
  locks the desktop.

Windows XP
Windows XP adds the following:
  selects the first icon in the Notification Area.
  opens Search for Computers. Requires Active Directory Domain Services.
  locks the desktop and (if Fast User Switching is enabled) shows the user selection screen.

Windows XP Media Center Edition
Windows XP Media Center Edition adds the following:
  starts Windows Media Center.

Windows Vista
Windows Vista adds the following shortcuts:
  brings the Windows Sidebar to the front.
  selects next Windows Sidebar gadget item, bringing all gadgets to the foreground in process. Gadgets were removed in Windows 8. It shows up the Xbox game bar in Windows 10 and 11.
  invokes Windows Mobility Center.  Works only if portable computer features are installed. This key combination is reassigned in Windows 8.
  switches active app using Aero Flip 3D.  Requires desktop composition, a feature of Windows Aero. Aero Flip 3D is removed in Windows 8 and this key is reassigned.
  is same as above, but Aero Flip 3D remains even when this key combination is released. Arrow keys or mouse may be used to navigate between windows.
  through ,  starts the corresponding Quick Launch Bar program.  runs the tenth item. Quick Launch is removed in Windows 7 and this key is reassigned.
 locks the computer.

Windows 7
Windows 7 adds the following shortcuts:
  activates Aero Peek. Reassigned in Windows 8.
  toggles between the devices that receive video card's output. The default is computer monitor only. Other options are video projector only, both showing the same image and both showing a portion of a larger desktop.
  maximizes the active window.
  restores the default window size and state of the active window, if maximized. Otherwise, minimizes the active window.
  to iterate through items on the taskbar from left to right.
  to iterate through items on the taskbar from right to left.
  to zoom into the screen at the mouse cursor position using the Magnifier Utility.
  to zoom out if the Magnifier Utility is running.
  to exit zoom.
  through ,  to either start or switch to the corresponding program pinned to taskbar.  runs the tenth item. Press multiple times to cycle through the application's open windows. Press and release quickly to keep the taskbar's preview open (which allows you to cycle using arrow keys).
  minimizes all windows other than the active window. Pressing this combination a second time restores them.
  minimizes all windows. Pressing the combination a second time restores them.

Windows 8
Windows 8 introduces the following:
  Opens the Start Screen.
  opens the charms. Reassigned in Windows 10.

  opens Search charm in file mode to search for computer files. If the Search charm is already open, switches to file search mode.
  opens Search charm in settings mode to search for Control Panel applets. If the Search charm is already open, switches to settings search mode.
  opens Search charm in app mode to search for app shortcuts and executable files. If the search charm is already open, it has no effects.

  opens the Share charm.

  opens the Devices charm for printing, connecting to a second screen/projector, or pushing multimedia content via Play To.

  opens Settings charm, where app-specific settings, network options and shutdown button is located.

  opens Quick Links menu and grants access to several frequently used features of Windows, such as accessing desktop or File Explorer. With Windows 8.1 update, it includes a shortcut to shut down or restart the computer.
  or right click opens the command bar for Metro-style apps. This bar appears at the bottom of the screen and replaces both context menu and toolbar in Metro-style apps.
  invokes the app switcher and changes between Metro-style apps. Unlike , the app switcher does not include windows that appear on desktop.
  changes input method. Unlike , this combination also causes a pop-up notification to appear.
  or  instantly saves a screenshot to the "Screenshots" folder in "Pictures" library. All screenshots are saved as PNG files.

Windows 8.1
Windows 8.1 introduces the following:
  locks device orientation
  activates the Search Everywhere charm, opening a sidebar at the side of the screen.
  activates the Ease of Access Center control panel applet.
  cycles through notifications.

Windows 10

Windows 10 introduces the following:
  opens Action Center.
  or  cycles through notifications.
  opens the clipboard history (after October 2018 update).
  activates Cortana listening mode.
  opens the Game DVR bar (Xbox Game Bar).
 starts or stops recording. All recordings are saved in the "Captures" folder in the "Videos" library as an MP4 file.
  records the last 30 seconds when background recording is turned on for the game.
  shows or hides the recording timer.
  instantly saves a screenshot to the "Captures" folder in the "Images" library. All screenshots are saved as PNG files.
  opens Settings.
  opens the Feedback Hub.
  opens the Widget panel.
  opens task view (opens timeline and remains after April 2018 Update).
  through  to align a window snapped to the right or left to the corresponding quadrant of the screen.
  creates a new virtual desktop.
  refreshes display in case of screen lockup.
  closes the active virtual desktop.
  or  switches between virtual desktops.
  or  opens the emoji panel while typing (this was changed on the "May 2019 update").
  opens the dictation toolbar (after Fall Creators Update).
 brings up projection settings: PC screen only, Duplicate, Extend, Second screen only and Connect to a wireless display.
 Opens Snip & Sketch tool to capture screen selection and puts into clipboard.
  Opens website https://www.office.com/?from=OfficeKey (or Microsoft 365).
  Opens OneDrive.
  Opens website LinkedIn.
  Opens website Yammer.
  Opens OneNote.
  Opens Outlook.
  Opens PowerPoint.
  Opens Teams.
  Opens Word.
  Opens Excel.
  Open the 1st app in taskbar.
  Open the 2nd app in taskbar.
  Open the 3rd app in taskbar.
  Open the 4th app in taskbar.
  Open the 5th app in taskbar.
  Open the 6th app in taskbar.
  Open the 7th app in taskbar.
  Open the 8th app in taskbar.
  Open the 9th app in taskbar.
  Open the Emojis.
  Open the Workspace (temporality) (ends when you release the key ).
  Enables or disables the color filters.

Microsoft Office
Additional installed software may introduce other shortcuts using the Windows key.  For example, various Microsoft Office applications add shortcuts of their own:
  to open a new side note in OneNote.
  to open OneNote.
  to open Skype for Business.  This shortcut also places the cursor directly on the search bar.  (Disabled in Skype for Business 2016)

Use with other operating systems 
The Windows key can also be used on other operating systems.

On Unix and Unix-like operating systems, the key is usually given the X keysym "Super" (on earlier versions "Meta" was often used), and turns on the shift bit called MOD4. Most desktop environments use it much like Windows, with press+release popping up a primary menu similar to the Windows start menu (GNOME Shell bringing up the Activities Overview, KDE Plasma, Cinnamon and most other desktop environments pop up their main system menus), and with combinations with letters performing actions such as run-command, often with the shortcuts and actions copied from Windows. A common action that is not shared with Windows is for the key to allow dragging a window around from any location without raising it, and in the Compiz window manager it causes the scroll wheel to zoom in or out of any part of the desktop.

If one plugs a Windows keyboard into a ChromeOS computer, the Windows key acts as the  key. This key is in the location where the Caps Lock key would be on other keyboards.

If one plugs a Windows keyboard into an Xbox 360, pressing the Windows key performs the same action as the Guide button on Xbox 360 Controller or remote controls, opening the Xbox Guide. Holding down the Windows key and pressing M opens a pop up conversation window over gameplay, if an instant message conversation is in progress. On a PlayStation 3 console, pressing the Windows key performs the same action as the PS Button on the Sixaxis Controller, opening the XrossMediaBar.

If one plugs a Windows keyboard into an Xbox One or Xbox Series S|X, pressing the Windows key performs the same action as pressing the Xbox button on a controller.

References

External links 

Microsoft Support page
 Keyboard shortcuts in Windows 7 and above
 How to enable or disable the keyboard Windows key

Computer keys